Dominique Bouchard (born May 29, 1991) is a Canadian Olympian and celebrated four-time NCAA All-American competition swimmer who specialized in backstroke events. She is now retired from competitive swimming and has completed a Doctorate in Medicine. Dr. Bouchard is now completing her residency in family medicine at Health Sciences North in Canada.

Career
Bouchard is an Olympian and was a long time member of the women's Canadian National Swim Team. She reached semi-finals in both her individual events, i.e. the 100M and 200M backstroke (top ten overall finish in the 200M backstroke) at the 2016 Rio de Janeiro Olympic Games. Bouchard has a considerable amount of international experience having represented Canada at the 2015 World Aquatic Championship in Kazan Russia where she achieved a sixth-place finish (200m backstroke). She was a multiple medalist at the 2015 Pan American Games in Toronto Canada (silver-200m Backstroke; silver 400 medley relay; and gold in the 4x 100 freestyle relay). Bouchard has also represented Canada at the 2014 Pan Pacific Swimming Championships (5th in 100m Back and 6 in 200m Backstroke) in Gold Coast Australia, as well as in 2010 in Irvine, California. She also competed in the 2011 Summer World University Games in Shenzhen, China, and was a finalist in the 100-m backstroke (8th), 200-m backstroke (5th) and 4x100-m medley relay (6th).

Born in St. Albert, Alberta, she also lived in Toronto and but started competitive swimming in Kirkland Lake, Ontario, before heading to North Bay. The turning point in her swimming career was meeting coach Cliff Noth, who moved to North Bay from Vancouver and had experience working with the national team. Bouchard is a consummate student-athlete and holds a master's degree in health administration from the University of Missouri (magna cum laude) as well as a B.Sc. in biology and B.A. in psychology (both cum laude) from this same institution. Among Bouchard’s favourite swimming moments is earning a second-place finish at the NCAA Championships in both 2011 and 2012. Although affiliated with the Oakville Aquatic Club, Bouchard continued to train at her alma mater with the Missouri Tigers, where she was a four-time All-American and set the school record in the 200-yard backstroke. Bouchard was inducted into the Sports Hall of Fame of the University of Missouri in 2018.

She retired from competitive swimming in December 2017. Bouchard has completed a Medical Degree at the Northern Ontario School of Medicine and is a resident in Family Medicine at Health Science North. She also manages to provide advice to swim clubs and helps mentor the next generation of swimmers on a part-time basis.

References

1991 births
Living people
Canadian female backstroke swimmers
Missouri Tigers women's swimmers
Sportspeople from St. Albert, Alberta
Swimmers at the 2015 Pan American Games
Pan American Games gold medalists for Canada
Pan American Games silver medalists for Canada
Swimmers at the 2016 Summer Olympics
Olympic swimmers of Canada
Pan American Games medalists in swimming
Medalists at the 2015 Pan American Games